Darkaz Baluk (also Romanized as Darkaz Balūk; also known as Dargaz Kūlak) is a village in Geshmiran Rural District, in the Central District of Manujan County, Kerman Province, Iran. At the 2006 census, its population was 46, in 12 families.

References 

Populated places in Manujan County